Langourla is a former commune in the Côtes-d'Armor department of Brittany in north-western France. On 1 January 2016, it was merged into the new commune Le Mené.

Population

Inhabitants of Langourla are called langourlaciens in French.

See also
Communes of the Côtes-d'Armor department

References

External links

Former communes of Côtes-d'Armor